Frank-Eberhard Höltje (born 21 August 1953) is a German fencer. He competed in the individual and team sabre events for East Germany at the 1980 Summer Olympics.

References

1953 births
Living people
People from Salzwedel
People from Bezirk Magdeburg
German male fencers
Sportspeople from Saxony-Anhalt
Olympic fencers of East Germany
Fencers at the 1980 Summer Olympics